Cormac Donnelly (born 1989) is an Irish hurling coach and former player as a full-back at senior level for the Antrim county team.

Donnelly made his first appearance for the team during the 2008 championship and has become a regular player over the last few seasons. During that time he has won three Ulster winners' medals and a Walsh Cup winners' medal.

At club level Donnelly plays with the McQuillans, Ballycastle club.

In December 2020, himself and Dominic McKinley were named as head coaches of the senior Derry county hurling team.

Honours
 5 Ulster Senior Hurling Championships (2008, 2009, 2010, 2011, 2012)
 1 Walsh Cup (2008)
 2 Ulster Under-21 Hurling Championships (2009, 2010)
 2 Ulster Minor Hurling Championships (2006, 2007)

References

1989 births
Living people
Antrim inter-county hurlers
Ballycastle McQuillan hurlers
Hurling coaches
Ireland international hurlers
Ulster inter-provincial hurlers